Indian Hills is an unincorporated community and census-designated place in Torrance County, New Mexico, United States. Its population was 892 as of the 2010 census.

Geography

Demographics

Education
It is in the Moriarty-Edgewood School District.

References

Census-designated places in New Mexico
Census-designated places in Torrance County, New Mexico